Federico Fellini International Airport, formerly Rimini Miramare Airport, is an international airport located at Miramare,  southeast of Rimini, Italy. It also is the main aerial gateway to the nearby independent republic of San Marino. The airport is named after Italian filmmaker Federico Fellini. Since 2015, Rimini Airport has been managed by AIRiminum 2014 S.p.A.

Facilities

Airlines and destinations
The following airlines operate regular scheduled and charter flights at Rimini Airport:

Statistics

Ground transportation

Bus

The airport is served by the following routes operated by Start Romagna:

Metromare Rapid Transit Rimini Railway Station-Rimini Airport-Rimini Miramare Railway Station-Riccione Railway Station
9 Rimini Airport-Rimini Ospedale-Rimini Railway Station-Santa Giustina-Santarcangelo di Romagna
9A Rimini Airport-Rimini Ospedale-Rimini Railway Station-Santa Giustina-San Vito
124 Rimini Railway Station-Viale Losanna (Airport)-Riccione-Morciano di Romagna
171 Rimini Railway Station-Via Flaminia (Airport)-Riccione-Montecolombo
174 Rimini Railway Station-Via Flaminia (Airport)-Riccione-Morciano di Romagna-Montegridolfo

Train

The nearest railway stations to the Airport are Rimini, Rimini Miramare and Riccione.

Private car

The following options are available:

From Bologna and Ancona: A14 Motorway, Riccione Sud's exit
From Ravenna: S. S. 16 Adriatica national route
From Perugia: E45 European Route
From the Republic of San Marino: S. S: 72 National Route (via Consolare)

References

External links

 Official website 
 
 

Airports in Italy
Buildings and structures in Rimini
Transport in Emilia-Romagna
Airfields of the United States Army Air Forces in Italy
Airports established in 1929
1929 establishments in Italy
Federico Fellini